Paradise Beach is a suburb of Jeffreys Bay in Sarah Baartman District Municipality in the Eastern Cape province of South Africa.

References

Populated places in the Kouga Local Municipality
Populated coastal places in South Africa